The ÇOMÜ Hospital (more commonly referred to as Çanakkale University Hospital) is the biggest research and teaching hospital in the Western Marmara region of Turkey which serves the area of north Aegean and South-West Marmara regions. The current president and chief executive officer is Dr. Murat Coşar. The hospital is a 160-bed facility that provides patients with a complete range of primary and specialty care services.

It is well respected as one of the leading community teaching and research hospitals in Turkey, affiliated with the Çanakkale Onsekiz Mart University (ÇOMÜ). The university hospital has one of the busiest emergency departments in the country.

The COMU Hospital is staffed by 160 full-time attending physicians 124 of them are also faculty members of the COMÜ Faculty of Medicine. The University Hospital has more than 5,000 admissions, 2,500 births, and 215,000 outpatient visits annually.

History 
The hospital was established in 2007 in Kepez district as the teaching and research hospital for the university of Çanakkale Onsekiz Mart School of Medicine. The rapid growth of the area led the hospital to continue to expand to some surrounding medical buildings. In 2012 the Nedime Hanim Site was added to the Hospital network. The new and bigger hospital buildings with 300-bed facility are also under construction. The new medical site is planned in the main campus of the university.

Statistics
 Beds: 160
 Full-Time Employees: 520
 Active Medical Staff: 280
 Lecturer Medical Staff: 124
 Admissions: 5,000
 Average Length of Stay: 5
 Emergency Room Visits: 3.500
 Trauma Patients: 850
 Surgeries:
 Million Annual Budget (Approximately): 35 million Turkish liras

Programs, Services and Clinics

Programs & Services 
 Accident and Emergency (Emergency Department)
 Post Graduate Medical Centre
 Allergy
 Anaesthesia
 Andrology
 Audiology
 Back Pain Service
 Biochemistry & Immunology
 Blood Service
 Bone (Metabolic) Unit & Bone Density Unit
 Breast Unit
 Breathlessness Intervention Service
 Eye Unit
 Health at Work Service
 Heart Clinic
 IVF
 Cancer
 Cardiac Rehabilitation Service
 Cardiology (Heart)
 Cataract Clinic
 Child Development Centre
 Children's Eye Service (Paediatric Ophthalmology)
 Children's Services (Paediatrics)
 Chronic obstructive pulmonary disease (COPD) - Co-creating Health
 Chronic Pain Service
 Clinical Immunology
 Clinical Investigation Ward
 Clinical Pharmacology
 Clinical Research Facility
 Colorectal Unit
 Colposcopy
 Critical Care Outreach
 Co-creating Health
 Community Midwifery Team
 Core Biochemical Assay Laboratory (CBAL)
 Cytogenetics & Molecular Genetics Laboratory
 Cytology - Cervical/Diagnostic
 Day Surgery
 Delivery Unit
 Department of Medicine for the Elderly (DME)
 Dermatology (Skin)
 Diabetes
 Dialysis
 Dietetics
 Disablement Service Centre
 Elderly Medicine
 Emergency Department
 Endocrinology
 Endoscopy
 ENT (Ear, Nose and Throat)
 Epilepsy services
 Eye Unit
 Eye Department (Ophthalmology)
 Familial gastric cancer study
 Gastroenterology
 Gastroenterology, Hepatology and Nutrition (Paediatric)
 Genetics
 Genetics laboratories
 Genitourinary Medicine (GUM) and Sexual Health Advice Centre (SHAC)
 Gynaecology
 Gynaecological Oncology
 Haematological Laboratories
 Haemophilia Centre
 Hepato-Pancreato-Biliary Cancer Service
 Hereditary Diffuse Gastric Cancer (HDGC) study
 Histopathology
 Immunology
 Immunology Laboratories
 Infection control
 Infectious Diseases
 Intensive Care Unit (ICU)
 Intermediate Dependency Area
 Kidney (Renal)
 Psychiatry Service
 Low vision advice and liaison service
 Lung Function Unit
 Lupus & Vasculitis
 Lysosomal Disorders
 Major trauma centre
 Maternity Services
 Maxillofacial Surgery
 Medical Physics and Clinical Engineering
 Melanoma support group
 Mental Health
 Metabolic Bone Disease
 Microbiology & Virology
 Molecular Genetics
 Molecular Malignancy Laboratory
 Neonatal Services
 Nephrology (Renal/kidney)
 Neuro Critical Care Unit
 Neurosciences (Brain and Nerves)
 Neurotology & Skull Base Surgery Unit
 Nuclear Medicine
 Nutrition and Dietetics
 Obesity
 Occupational Health
 Occupational Therapy
 Oncology (Cancer)
 Ophthalmology (Eye Department)
 Oral & Maxillofacial Surgery (Mouth & Face)
 Orthodontics
 Otolaryngology (Ear, Nose & Throat)
 Otology (Ear)
 Outpatient physiotherapy
 Paediatrics (Children's Services)
 Paediatric Gastroenterology, Hepatology and Nutrition
 Paediatric Intensive Care Unit
 Pain Service
 Palliative care
 Patient Advice and Liaison Service (PALS)
 Pathology
 Pharmacy
 Phlebotomy Service (Blood)
 Physiotherapy
 Planned Short Stay Unit
 Plastic Surgery
 Pleural Service
 Porphyria
 Post Graduate Medical Centre
 Pre-assessment
 Prenatal & Neonatal Screening
 Psychiatry - Cambridgeshire and Peterborough Mental Health Partnership NHS Trust
 Radiology
 Radiotherapy
 Rehabilitation Medicine
 Renal (Nephrology)
 Renal Genetics & Tubular Disorders Clinic
 Respiratory Medicine
 Rheumatology
 Severe Insulin Resistance Service
 Skin cancer service
 Speech and Language Therapy
 Thoracic Unit
 Thrombosis Treatment Team
 Tissue Typing
 Trauma and Orthopaedics
 Transplant
 Upper Gastrointestinal (GI) Unit
 Urology (Urinary Tract)
 Vascular Surgery
 Vasculitis and lupus service
 Virology & Microbiology
 Ward information
 Wellcome Trust Clinical Research Facility (CRF)
 Women's Services

Clinics 
 Children's Outpatients
 Dermatology / Plastic Surgery
 Diabetes and Endocrine Clinic
 Ear, Nose & Throat (ENT)
 Eye Clinic
 Gastroenterology, Neurosciences, Infectious Medicine, Hepatology, Renal
 General Surgery
 Genito-Urinary medicine
 Heart
 Medical, Cardiology & Elderly (DME)
 Mental Health
 Respiratory (Chest), Allergy & Immunology
 Rheumatology
 Oral & Maxillofacial Surgery and Orthodontics
 Orthopaedics & Trauma
 Trauma & Orthopaedics
 Urology

The Kepez Site 
The main building (Kepez Campus) is located at main street in Kepez Square. It was opened in 2007 by the permission of the Turkish National Health Ministry. The hospital underwent an expansion in the 2011 and work was completed with additional bed spaces in early 2012.

The ÇOMÜ Hospital is a primary multi-care facility (open 24 hours) in its area, an Academic community hospital.

Nedime Hanım Site 
The Nedime Hanım Site is located at Nedime Hanım Square, Old City.

The Emergency Service (Department) 
The hospital's Emergency Service operates 24-hours a day, 365 days a year. It is based at Kepez Site. The Emergency Service serves the local population of Çanakkale province as well as adjoining parts of Balıkesir and surrounding area.

See also
List of hospitals in Turkey

References

External links
 Official website

Hospital buildings completed in 2007
Teaching hospitals in Turkey
Hospitals in Çanakkale
Hospitals established in 2007
Çanakkale Onsekiz Mart University
21st-century architecture in Turkey